Dharmamurthi Rao Bhahadur Calavala Cunnan Chetty's Hindu College, also known as D.R.B.C.C.C.  Hindu College or known locally as the Hindu College, is a general degree college located at Pattabiram, Chennai, Tamil Nadu. It was established in the year 1969. The college is affiliated with University of Madras. This college offers different courses in arts, commerce and science.

Accreditation

The college is  recognized by the University Grants Commission (UGC).

See also
Education in India
Literacy in India
List of institutions of higher education in Tamil Nadu

References

External links

Educational institutions established in 1969
1969 establishments in Tamil Nadu
Colleges affiliated to University of Madras
Universities and colleges in Chennai
Hindu universities and colleges